= Badial =

Coordinates: 31.457°N 75.921°E

Badial is a small village in the area of Dona in Kapurthala, Punjab, India with a population around 500. It is situated on the road Kala Sanghia-Sidwa Dona. There is one small gurdwara as well as a playing ground. Most of people are farmers.
